Vestec is a municipality and village in Prague-West District in the Central Bohemian Region of the Czech Republic. It has about 2,700 inhabitants.

Science
Vestec is home of BIOCEV (Biotechnology and Biomedicine Center in Vestec).

References

Villages in Prague-West District